The James W. Murphy Stakes is an American Thoroughbred horse race run annually at Pimlico Race Course in Baltimore, Maryland. Open to three-year-old horses, it is contested over a distance of one mile on turf.

Beginning with the 2010 race, the Woodlawn Stakes was renamed the James W. Murphy Stakes in honor of the late trainer, James W. Murphy, a stalwart on the Maryland racing circuit.  The race is run on the third Saturday of May on the Preakness Stakes undercard. The race was originally named in honor of the Woodlawn Vase. Due to heavy rains, the 2008 edition had to be switched from the turf to  miles on the muddy main track.

The race attracts a different type of horse than the older Dixie Stakes, also run on the turf at Pimlico on that same day. First and most importantly, the Woodlawn is run at one mile, which is considered a sprint on the turf, while the Dixie is run at  miles. Horses from the Woodlawn will typically be candidates for the Breeders' Cup Mile later in the year, while Dixie Stakes horses will typically target the Breeders' Cup Turf. The Woodlawn is also restricted to only horses that are three years old, while the Dixie is for any horse three years old and up.

Artie Schiller in 2004 and English Channel in 2005 are the only Woodlawn Stakes winners to go on and win a Breeders' Cup race.

The Woodlawn Stakes was run as a Handicap race in 1966. The race was taken off the turf and run on the main track in 1967, 1975–1978, 1980, 1981, 1988–1990, 1997, 1998 and 2003. The Woodlawn Stakes was an American Grade III stakes race between 1973 through 1989.

The race was run in two divisions in 1986, 1985, 1981, 1975, 1974, 1973, 1971, 1969 and 1968.

Records 

 
Speed record: 
 1 mile – 1:34.32 – Woodwin W    (2015)
  miles – 1:43 2/5 – Pulverizing  (1989)

Most wins by a jockey:
 3 – Eldon Nelson (1967, 1970, 1973)
 3 – William Passmore (1969, 1981 (2×))
 3 – Vincent Bracciale Jr. (1973, 1980, 1985)
 3 – Edgar Prado (1993, 1996, 1997)
 3 – John R. Velazquez (2005, 2009, 2011)
 3 – Joel Rosario (2012, 2013, 2017)

Most wins by a trainer:
 3 – Del W. Carroll (1969, 1970, 1980)

Most wins by an owner:
 2 – Skeedattle Associates (2001 & 2002)
 2 – Frank E. Power (1969, 1971)

Winners 

A #  signifies that the race was run in two divisions in 1985, 1981, 1975, 1974, 1973, 1971, 1969 and 1968.

See also 

 James W. Murphy Stakes top three finishers
 Pimlico Race Course
 List of graded stakes at Pimlico Race Course

References 

Flat horse races for three-year-olds
Turf races in the United States
Listed stakes races in the United States
Sports competitions in Baltimore
Pimlico Race Course
Horse races in Maryland
Recurring sporting events established in 1966